Corambe pacifica common name Pacific corambe is a species of sea slug, an Eastern Pacific Ocean nudibranch, a marine, opisthobranch gastropod mollusk in the family Corambidae.

This species feeds on bryozoans.

Distribution
Corambe pacifica are found on the west coast of North America.

References

 Behrens, D.W. (1980). Pacific Coast Nudibranchs: A guide to the Opisthobranchs of the Northeastern Pacific. Sea challengers, Los Osos, California.
 MacFarland, F.M.& O'Donoghue, C.H. (1929). A new species of Corambe from the Pacific coast of North America. Proceedings of the California Academy of Sciences, fourth series, 18(1): 1-27.
Yoshioka, P.M. (1986). Life history patterns of the dorid nudibranchs Doridella steinbergaeand Corambe pacifica. Marine Ecology Progress Series, 31: 179-184.
 Yoshioka, P.M. (1986). Competitive coexistence of the dorid nudibranchs Doridella steinbergae and Corambe pacifica. Marine Ecology Progress Series, 33: 81-88.

External links 

Corambidae
Gastropods described in 1929